Reach for Tomorrow is a 1956 collection of science fiction short stories by British writer Arthur C. Clarke. All the stories  originally appeared in a number of different publications.

Contents
This collection includes:

"Preface"
"Rescue Party"
"A Walk in the Dark"
"The Forgotten Enemy"
"Technical Error"
"The Parasite"
"The Fires Within"
"The Awakening"
"Trouble With the Natives"
"The Curse"
"Time's Arrow"
"Jupiter Five"
"The Possessed"

Reception
Galaxy reviewer Floyd C. Gale described the collection as "an excellent cross-section of the art of one of science fiction's foremost exponents." Anthony Boucher, however, characterized most of the shorter pieces as inferior work, excluded from Clarke's previous collection, but praised two (unspecified) novelettes as "uniquely authentic Clarke."

References

Sources

External links 
 
 Open Library's entry for Reach for Tomorrow

1956 short story collections
Science fiction short story collections
Short story collections by Arthur C. Clarke
Books with cover art by Richard M. Powers
Ballantine Books books